Ijeri  is a village in the southern state of Karnataka, India. It is located in the Jevargi taluk of Kalaburagi district.

Demographics
 India census, Ijeri had a population of 5923 with 3069 males and 2854 females.

See also
 Gulbarga
 Districts of Karnataka

References

External links
 http://Gulbarga.nic.in/

Villages in Kalaburagi district